David Sánchez López (born 20 July 1994) is a Spanish weightlifter who competes in the 69 kg category. He placed tenth at the 2016 Olympics, and competed at the 2014 and 2015 World Weightlifting Championships.

Taking up the sport as a fifteen-year-old teen, Sánchez was named Male Sportsperson of the Year in 2013.

Major results

References

External links 
 

1994 births
Living people
Spanish male weightlifters
Sportspeople from Melilla
Weightlifters at the 2016 Summer Olympics
Olympic weightlifters of Spain
European Weightlifting Championships medalists
Weightlifters at the 2020 Summer Olympics
20th-century Spanish people
21st-century Spanish people
Competitors at the 2022 Mediterranean Games
Mediterranean Games competitors for Spain